Lindy Rama-Ellis (née Lindy Rama) is an Australian-Indonesian model, entrepreneur and Indonesian Princess.

Early life 
Rama-Ellis' mother, Frances Parker, was a school teacher in Arnhem Land when she took a cheap holiday to Bali where she met Anak Agung Oka Rama. Rama-Ellis was born a Balinese princess and grew up in the palace before moving to Tasmania with her mother after her parents divorced when she was three. Rama-Ellis' uncle, Ida Cokorde Pamecutan XI, was the king of Denpasar and she stated that she didn't know she was part of the royal family because she didn't have much contact with her dad after the divorce. 

Des, her maternal grandfather became like her father in Australia and often took her fishing and camping. Her stepfather Mike, came into her life when she was five and would often pick her up from dance lessons and school.

Career 
At the age of 20, Rama-Ellis began modeling and walked in high-end fashion shows like Gucci and Chanel. She attended New York fashion week in 2008 representing top Australian designer, Toni Maticevski. Early in her career Rama-Ellis stated that she had a bad body image and dropped down to weigh just 42 kilograms at her lowest.

She is a regular attendee of both Sydney and Melbourne fashion weeks and has been an ambassador for "La Mer" and designed a collection with brand "Mercer + Reid".

Rama-Ellis and Klim co-owned "Milk & Co" skin care. What started out as a men's range of products, Rama-Elis expanded the line to include a range for children.

In 2017, Rama-Ellis launched a fashion label named "Rama Voyage".

In 2020, Rama-Ellis launched "Fig Femme", a wellness brand that encourages open and honest self-care by selling items such as a vulva mask.

Personal life 

At 16, Rama-Ellis started a relationship with a musician who was six years older than her. The couple were together for ten years and lived in London together for four years. After the 2004 Athens Olympics, Rama-Ellis was a model for Myer when she met her future husband, Olympic swimmer Michael Klim on the catwalk. She credits her relationship with Klim for teaching her how to be confident. Rama-Ellis married Michael Klim in 2006 and divorced in 2016. The couple have two daughters and a son together and spent much of their relationship living between Bali and Melbourne. Two years after her divorce from Klim in August 2018, Rama-Ellis remarried with British property developer Adam Ellis and the pair welcomed a daughter in December 2017. The couple announced their engagement in late 2016 after Ellis proposed during a trip to Morocco.

Her father Oka Rama died of heart problems a few weeks after the birth of Rama-Ellis' first child.

Rama-Ellis has lent supports to charities including Brainwave, Sids, Bali Orphanage, Sumba Foundation and the Witchery (Silver Diary) Ovarian Cancer Campaign.

In 2020, Rama-Ellis and her family suffered from Dengue fever.

References 

Australian female models
Living people
Australian businesspeople
Year of birth missing (living people)